Ma'ale Gilboa (lit. Gilboa Ascent) is a religious kibbutz located on the summit of Mount Gilboa, on the northeast end of the ridge of the Samarian hills in Israel. Located about 5 km west of Beit She'an, it falls under the jurisdiction of Beit She'an Valley Regional Council.

History
The kibbutz was founded in 1962 as a Nahal settlement, on the land of depopulated Palestinian village of Khirbat al-Jawfa and on land that formerly had belonged to Faqqu'a.

In 1967 it was settled by members of the Religious Kibbutz Movement. Ma'ale Gilboa is located just north of another religious kibbutz, Meirav. As they are both religious kibbutzim, it was decided that, although they are located in the Gilboa mountains (and would naturally fall under the jurisdiction of Gilboa Regional Council) it would be better to include them in Beit She'an Valley Regional Council, where there is a group of religious kibbutzim, including Ein HaNatziv, Sde Eliyahu, Shluhot and Tirat Zvi.

In 1997, after economic and social hardships, the kibbutz faced a crisis and was almost dissolved.  Today the economy of the kibbutz is thriving; the kibbutz has managed to repay its debts and has recorded a profit. As with most kibbutzim in Israel today, Ma'ale Gilboa is in the process of privatization.  Some aspects of the socialist kibbutz structure are disappearing, and individual services for members of the kibbutz are translated into their economic value. As a result, the kibbutz is not only enjoying economic prosperity but is growing demographically as well.  In 2007-2008 the kibbutz began building additional housing units for families interested in joining the community.

The main sources of livelihood are agricultural; growing carrots, dairy farming, and raising turkeys for meat. Most of the members and residents of the community work off the kibbutz.

Education
Notably, the kibbutz houses Yeshivat Ma'ale Gilboa, which, following the closure of Yeshivat Ein Tzurim is currently the only functioning yeshivat shiluv, which combine two years of Torah study with three years of army service. This is in contrast to Hesder yeshivot, which combine a year and a half of army with three and a half years of Torah study.

References

External links
Yeshivat Ma'ale Gilboa

Kibbutzim
Religious Kibbutz Movement
Populated places established in 1962
Nahal settlements
Populated places in Northern District (Israel)
1962 establishments in Israel